Stefan Kostrzewski (4 August 1902 – 24 February 1999) was a Polish sprinter. He competed in the men's 400 metres at the 1928 Summer Olympics.

References

External links
 

1902 births
1999 deaths
Athletes (track and field) at the 1924 Summer Olympics
Athletes (track and field) at the 1928 Summer Olympics
Polish male sprinters
Polish male middle-distance runners
Polish male hurdlers
Olympic athletes of Poland
Sportspeople from Łódź
People from Piotrków Governorate
20th-century Polish people